Nagabhushan "Rao Machiraju" is an Indian American scientist and business executive, and holds 10 patents in information retrieval.

Background and career 

He has an interdisciplinary educational background: Masters in Public Health (M.P.H. from California State University, Northridge), he studied General Systems and Information Networks under James Grier Miller and Kjell Samuelson (Certificate from United Nations Institute for Training and Research, University of Stockholm and UCLA), and Ed.D in Instructional Technology'(Doctorate from University of Southern California). He was an Executive in Residence and Co-Director of Center for Human Applied Reasoning and the Internet of Things, (Chariot) at the University of Southern California. Formerly he
was a Co-founder and the CEO of reQall Inc., an MIT Media Lab spin off, a former advisor to Dimagi with Sandy Pentland, and a NASA Research Partner. He is also the Co-founder of Magically Inc., N. Rao Machiraju, was a Principal Scientist at Apple Inc., heading various groups including The Advanced Technology Group (ATG) Learning Communities Laboratory. Rao and his team have won the 1993 Optimas Award for Innovation and Excellence for Apple Inc. Rao also was a Co-founder of Magically Inc and ConceptLabs.

Rao worked on a number of research and development efforts in information retrieval, organizational memory, wrote a number of articles and also lectured extensively. In 1996, the term "location sense" was coined by Rao Machiraju to refer to a capability of a device that can ascertain its location. Rao was also on the editorial boards of Journal of Expert Systems and Journal of Telematics and Informatics as a Founding member. He was also on the Board of Councilors of National Science Foundation Engineering Research Center on Multi-Media Computing in (Integrated Media Systems Center) at the University of Southern California, and served on the Advisory Board of Dimagi.com, an MIT Medialab spin off. Rao also served as Chief Mentor for Ventura Technology Incubator. He is also a faculty member at USC.

Research and Publications 
 The ATG Learning Communities Laboratory - An Overview by N.Rao Machiraju.
 Apple’s Education Research Agenda by N. Rao Machiraju.
 A study of the usage of an international computer communications network: it's (sic) implications for distance education.
 Handheld computers for Rural Healthcare: Experiences in a Large Scale Implementation.
 Microcomputer-based informatics: some training considerations.
 Telematics and Informatics: An International Journal on Telecommunications & Information Technology.
 International informatics access '87.

References 

American technology chief executives
Apple Inc. employees
Businesspeople in software
Internet pioneers
Living people
People from the San Francisco Bay Area
USC Rossier School of Education alumni
University of Southern California faculty
California State University, Northridge alumni
American people of Indian descent
Year of birth missing (living people)